A place in ancient Israel, Baal-Gad was a Canaanite town in the valley of Lebanon at the foot of Hermon, near the source of Jordan River (Josh. 13:5; 11:17; 12:7). It was the most northern point to which Joshua's conquests extended. It probably derived its name from the worship of Baal.

Identification
Its exact location is uncertain, but it is generally considered to be Hasbaya in Wadi et-Teim or a site nearby.

Easton's suggests that its modern representative is Banias. Some have supposed it to be the same as Baalbek. Others have suggested that it is the same location as Baal-hamon.

 

Hebrew Bible cities
Baal
Phoenician mythology